Andrew R. George (born 1955) is a British Assyriologist and academic best known for his edition and translation of the Epic of Gilgamesh. Andrew George is Professor of Babylonian, Department of the Languages and Cultures of Near and Middle East at the School of Oriental and African Studies, University of London.

Biography 
Andrew George studied Assyriology at the University of Birmingham (1973–79). In 1985 he presented his doctoral thesis, Babylonian Topographic Texts, at the University of London under the direction of Professor Wilfred G. Lambert. Since 1983 he has been a Lecturer in Akkadian and Sumerian Language and Literature at the School of Oriental and African Studies (SOAS), University of London. Afterwards he started teaching Babylonian Language and Literature at that University.

His best-known book is a translation of The Epic of Gilgamesh for Penguin Classics (2000).

He has been elected Honorary Member of the American Oriental Society (2012). He is a former Visiting Professor at the Heidelberg University (2000), Member of the prestigious Institute for Advanced Study in Princeton (2004-2005) and Research Associate at Rikkyo University, Tokyo (2009).

Books
 House Most High: The Temples of Ancient Mesopotamia (Mesopotamian Civilizations, Vol 5), Eisenbrauns, 1993, 
 The Epic of Gilgamesh: The Babylonian Epic Poem and Other Texts in Akkadian and Sumerian, 228pp, London: Allen Lane The Penguin Press 1999, London: Penguin Books 2000 .
 The Babylonian Gilgamesh Epic: Critical Edition and Cuneiform Texts, 996pp, Oxford University Press (England) (2003) .
Babylonian Literary Texts (2009), Cuneiform Royal Inscriptions (2011), Babylonian Divinatory Texts (2013) and Assyrian Archival Documents in the Schøyen Collection (2017), Capital Decisions Ltd.

Journals 
 For seventeen years, Andrew R. George was co-editor of the archaeological journal Iraq (1994-2011).

References

External links
 University of London, staff
 BBC Radio 4 In Our Time, "The Epic of Gilgamesh". George on the panel with Frances Reynolds and Martin Worthington.
 Lecture on the Epic of Gilgamesh on the Harvard Semitic Museum YouTube Channel, uploaded 30 January 2017.

British translators
Living people
Academics of SOAS University of London
1955 births
British Assyriologists
Assyriologists